Westboro is a town in Taylor County, Wisconsin, United States. The population was 660 at the 2000 census. The census-designated place of Westboro is located in the town. The unincorporated community of Queenstown is also located in the town.

Geography

Westboro is the largest town in Taylor County.  Instead of the typical six miles by six, it is six by twenty miles. According to the United States Census Bureau, the town has a total area of 125.4 square miles (324.9 km2), of which, 124.1 square miles (321.4 km2) of it is land and 1.3 square miles (3.5 km2) of it (1.07%) is water.

Westboro contains three of Taylor County's twelve Wisconsin State Natural Areas: Kidrick Swamp SNA, Silver Creek & Mondeaux River SNA, and part of Mondeaux Hardwoods SNA.

History

In 1847, surveyors working for the U.S. government walked the six mile squares that would become the town of Westboro. They marked off the outline of the town on foot using compass and chain. A crew came back in 1858 to survey all the section lines. When done, the deputy surveyor filed a general description for each six-mile square. Of them, the description of west-central Westboro (T33N R1W) is clearest: This Township contains a few Tamarac and Cedar Swamps of Small extent, most of them unfit for cultivation. The surface is a Rolling Soil first and Second rate.  Timber chiefly Hemlock Birch, Maple, Pine, Tamarac and Cedar. There is a large Windfall runs across the North West corner bears in South West and North East Direction Timber Decayed and grown to second Growth Popler.There is several creeks in this Township among which is the Yellow River runs in a North Westerly course across the South West corner of the Township. It is a deep and narrow Stream flows in a gentle current, not good for forming Motive Power for Mill. There is another Stream of considerable extent enters the Township near the South East corner and runs in a gentle current Northwesterly. It is a deep narrow Stream banks low and principally lined with Alder.

A different surveyor in 1862 was more enthusiastic about east-central Westboro, the six mile square where most of the population is today: A large portion of this Township is valuable for its splendid White Pine, also for its good soil. The surface is rolling and Timber heavy.

When Taylor County was formed in 1875, Westboro was six miles north to south same as today, but it spanned the full width of the county, including all modern towns from McKinley to Rib Lake.

In 1933 much of the cut-over west half of the town of Westboro was designated part of the Chequamegon National Forest.  Starting that year, a Civilian Conservation Corps camp at Mondeaux developed the Mondeaux Dam Recreation Area.

Demographics

As of the census of 2000, there were 660 people, 261 households, and 179 families residing in the town. The population density was 5.3 people per square mile (2.1/km2). There were 371 housing units at an average density of 3.0 per square mile (1.2/km2). The racial makeup of the town was 98.18% White, 0.61% African American, 0.15% Asian, and 1.06% from two or more races. Hispanic or Latino of any race were 0.30% of the population.

There were 261 households, out of which 35.2% had children under the age of 18 living with them, 57.9% were married couples living together, 4.6% had a female householder with no husband present, and 31.4% were non-families. 26.4% of all households were made up of individuals, and 12.3% had someone living alone who was 65 years of age or older. The average household size was 2.53 and the average family size was 3.08.

In the town, the population was spread out, with 28.2% under the age of 18, 6.8% from 18 to 24, 28.0% from 25 to 44, 24.5% from 45 to 64, and 12.4% who were 65 years of age or older. The median age was 37 years. For every 100 females, there were 103.1 males. For every 100 females age 18 and over, there were 104.3 males.

The median income for a household in the town was $33,021, and the median income for a family was $37,031. Males had a median income of $29,886 versus $21,354 for females. The per capita income for the town was $14,018. About 6.3% of families and 11.7% of the population were below the poverty line, including 18.0% of those under age 18 and 12.3% of those age 65 or over.

See also

Pine Line Trail

References

Towns in Taylor County, Wisconsin
Towns in Wisconsin